Yumoridash (also Romanized as Yūmorīdāsh, Yūmorī Dāsh, Yūmrī Dāsh, Yoomeridash, and Yūmerī Dāsh; also known as Yumeru Dasht, Yūmūrīdāsh, and Yūmūry Dasht) is a village in Baba Jik Rural District, in the Central District of Chaldoran County, West Azerbaijan Province, Iran. According to the 2006 census, its population was 264 individuals among 48 families.

References 

Populated places in Chaldoran County